Superficial may refer to:

Superficial anatomy, is the study of the external features of the body
Superficiality, the discourses in philosophy regarding social relation
Superficial charm, the tendency to be smooth, engaging, charming, slick and verbally facile
Superficial sympathy, false or insincere display of emotion such as a hypocrite crying fake tears of grief

In entertainment
 Superficial (album), an album by Heidi Montag, or its title track
 The Superficial, a website devoted to celebrity gossip
 "Superficial", a song by Natalia Kills from the album Perfectionist

See also
Artificial (disambiguation)
Synthetic (disambiguation)
Man-made (disambiguation)